tnftp (formerly lukemftp) is an FTP client for Unix-like operating systems. It is based on the original BSD FTP client, and is the default FTP client included with NetBSD, FreeBSD, OpenBSD, DragonFly BSD, Darwin, and MidnightBSD. It is maintained by Luke Mewburn.

It is notable in its support of server-side tab completion, a feature that the FTP client in GNU inetutils lacks.

BSD software
Free FTP clients
NetBSD